Stevens Records was a record label operated by father-and-son, Fred and Bill Stevens in Granite City, Illinois. Fred Stevens, a painter and his son Bill Stevens, an R&B enthusiast, were inspired by the thriving music scene in St. Louis and the neighboring East St. Louis, but they felt there was a lack of artists recording locally so they started their own label in 1959. The label is best known for their recordings of musician Ike Turner, who recorded under the name Icky Renrut because he was still under contract with Sun Records.

Discography

References 

American record labels
Rhythm and blues record labels
Rock and roll record labels
Record labels established in 1958
Granite City, Illinois
Music of St. Louis
Music of Illinois
Blues record labels
Companies based in Madison County, Illinois
Defunct record labels of the United States
1958 establishments in Illinois